American singer-songwriter Debbie Gibson has released eleven studio albums, six compilation albums, one box set, 41 singles, three video albums, and 27 music videos.

Albums

Studio albums

Compilations

Box sets

Soundtracks

Singles

Notes:
 1 Only released in the Philippines.
 2 Only released in Japan.
 3 Promo single.
 4 Only released in the United Kingdom.

Other recordings 
 1988 "Super Mix Club", Pioneer Records CD5 #25XD-996 (Japan-only compilation of maxi-single tracks).
 1990 "Whose World Is It?" (written for, and performed live at, Earth 90: Children and the Environment, a UNICEF benefit telecast), unreleased.
 1990 "Come Home (Wonder Years)", Atlantic Soundtrack 82032 The Wonder Years.
 1990 "In the Still of the Night (I'll Remember)", Atlantic Soundtrack 82032 The Wonder Years.
 1991 "A Medley of Rhymes", album track on For Our Children (Walt Disney 6061).
 1992 "Sleigh Ride", album track on A Very Special Christmas 2 (A&M Records).
 1993 Grease - The Original London Cast Recording, Epic Records (UK-only).
 1998 Z - The Masked Musical, Get Z'd Productions LLC.
 1999 "Light the World" (Duet w/Peabo Bryson), Unconditional Love (Windham Hill #01005-82169).
 2000 "You Belong to Me", a website-only download.
 2003 "Portrait in Loneliness", compilation album track, Universal Japan (Japan only).
 2006 "Someone You Love", O'Neill Brothers - Someone You Love (private label).
 2006 "Lost in Your Eyes" (acoustic version), O'Neill Brothers - Someone You Love (private label).
 2006 "Say Goodbye" (Duet with Jordan Knight),  Jordan Knight - Love Songs, (Billboard Adult Contemporary Chart #24) 
 2017 "I Am Peaceman" (Duet with Sir Ivan) (Billboard Dance Club Chart #26)

Other artists 
 1987 "Speed of Light", Reimy, A&M SP 12268 (Composer).
 1989 "Lost Love", Fuyuko Kurihara, Warner Pioneer 09L3-4065 (Composer).
 1990 "Ton of Bricks", The Party, Hollywood 60980 (Composer).
 1990 "Everytime We Say Goodbye", "Friendly", Ana - Body Language, Parc/Epic ZK 45355 (Composer, Producer, Arranger, keyboards, backing vocals).
 1991 "Voices That Care", all-star single, Giant 19350 (Choir).
 1991 Five songs for JoBeth Taylor, Melodian Records (Australia/New Zealand-only) (Composer, Producer/Co-Producer, programming and sequencing, backing vocals).
 1991 "Hip Hop", Chris Cuevas - Somehow, Someway, Atlantic LP 82187 (Co-composer, for help on the vocals).
 1991 "Someday", Chris Cuevas - Somehow, Someway, Atlantic LP 82187 (Co-lead vocal).
 1992 "Bedtime Stories", Jennifer Love Hewitt - Love Songs, Meldac (Co-writer, backing vocals).
 1995 "I Wanna Destroy You", Circle Jerks - Oddities, Abnormalities and Curiosities, Mercury/PolyGram 314 526 948 (backing vocals).
 2002 "Fever", w-inds. - w-inds.~The System of Alive~, Pony Canyon FPCCA-01824 (Japan only) (Co-Composer).
 2006 "Say Goodbye", Jordan Knight - Love Songs, Trans Continental TC-1-003 (Co-lead vocal).

Videography

Music videos

Video albums

Notes

References

External links 
 

Discography
Discographies of American artists
Pop music discographies